Then and Now (also Then and Now Shop) is a London-based Internet retailer that sells past season designer clothes and accessories at substantial discounts, as well as current-season items from designer names.

History 

Then and Now was established in Farringdon in December 2011 by Lian Michelson, a former Morgan Stanley trader.  The original inspiration for the site came about when Michelson noticed an absence of discounted menswear online, although the site was established to offer both men's and women's clothing and accessories.

Range 

The luxury goods retailer gets its name from selling past seasons' clothes at discounts of up to 75 per cent, as well as current designer collections. These include established brands such as Yves Saint Laurent and newer names such as Rick Owens. The range includes website exclusives, such as beauty goods from Essie and fashion from Eugene Lin.  The site works in partnership with other retailers to supply ranges for women, men, children and home.

References

External links 
Official website
Contribution to Style Council feature in Drapers, December 2013, p23
Absolutely Chelsea magazine, Fashion Notes, August 2012 p13

British companies established in 2011
Retail companies established in 2011
Internet properties established in 2011
Companies based in the City of London
Clothing companies of the United Kingdom
Retail companies based in London
2011 establishments in England